Sahla Tahtania (also written Sahela Tahtania) is a village in the commune of In Salah, in In Salah District, Tamanrasset Province, Algeria.

References

Neighbouring towns and cities

Populated places in Tamanrasset Province